In Greek mythology, Polybotes was one of the Giants, the offspring of Gaia (Earth), and Uranus (Sky). He fought Poseidon during the Gigantomachy, the war between the Giants and the gods.

Mythology
Polybotes was one of the Gigantes (Giants), the offspring of Gaia, born from the blood that fell when Uranus was castrated by their son Cronus. According to the mythographer Apollodorus, during the Gigantomachy, the cosmic battle of the Giants with the Olympian gods, Polybotes was crushed under Nisyros, a piece of the island of Kos broken off and thrown by Poseidon:
Polybotes was chased through the sea by Poseidon and came to Cos; and Poseidon, breaking off that piece of the island which is called Nisyrum, threw it on him.

The first-century BC geographer Strabo also records the story of Polybotes buried under Nisyros (or Kos itself):

They say that Nisyros is a fragment of Cos, and they add the myth that Poseidon, when he was pursuing one of the giants, Polybotes, broke off a fragment of Cos with his trident and hurled it upon him, and the missile became an island, Nisyros, with the giant lying beneath it. But some say that he lies beneath Cos.

The mention of a millstone, in a poem fragment by the seventh-century BC poet Alcman may be an early reference to the island of Nisyros.

The second-century AD geographer Pausanias mentions seeing at  Athens a statue of Poseidon battling Polybotes:

Not far from the temple is Poseidon on horseback, hurling a spear against the giant Polybotes, concerning whom is prevalent among the Coans the story about the promontory of Chelone.

In another version of the story, after being struck by Zeus, Polybotes swam away, Poseidon threw a trident at him but missed and the trident became the island of Nisyros or Porphyris.

Polybotes is named on two sixth-century BC black-figure pots. On one, a fragmentary dinos (Getty 81.AE.211), he is opposed by Zeus, identified by an inscription. On the other, an amphora (Louvre E732), he is opposed by Poseidon who is carrying the island of Nisyros on his left shoulder, ready to hurl it against the Giant. The scene depicted on the amphora: Poseidon with trident in his right hand and the island on his left shoulder, moving from left to right, fighting a Giant (mostly unnamed but usually presumed to be Polybotes, although one fifth-century BC example names the Giant Ephialtes) is a frequent occurrence in sixth and fifth-century BC Greek vase paintings.

Polybotes is also possibly named on a late sixth-century early fifth-century BC red-figure cup (Akropolis 2.211). A late fifth-century red-figure cup (Berlin F2531) shows on its interior Poseidon (without Nisyros) attacking Polybotes with his trident, in the presence of Gaia rising from the ground on the left.

Notes

References
 Apollodorus, Apollodorus, The Library, with an English Translation by Sir James George Frazer, F.B.A., F.R.S. in 2 Volumes. Cambridge, MA, Harvard University Press; London, William Heinemann Ltd. 1921.  Online version at the Perseus Digital Library.
 Arafat, K. W., Classical Zeus: A Study in Art and Literature, Clarendon Press, Oxford 1990. .
 Carvounis, Aikaterini, "Final Scenes in Quintus of Smyrna, Posthomerica 14" in Quintus Smyrnaeus: Transforming Homer in Second Sophistic Epic, Manuel Baumbach, Silvio Bär editors, Walter de Gruyter, 2007. .
 Cook, Arthur Bernard, Zeus: A Study in Ancient Religion, Volume III: Zeus God of the Dark Sky (Earthquakes, Clouds, Wind, Dew, Rain, Meteorites), Part I: Text and Notes, Cambridge University Press 1940. Online version at openlibrary.org
 Frazer, J. G., Pausanias's Description of Greece. Translated with a Commentary by J. G. Frazer. Vol II. Commentary on Book I, Macmillan, 1898. Google Books.
 Ferrari, Gloria, Alcman and the Cosmos of Sparta, University of Chicago Press, 2008. .
 Gantz, Timothy, Early Greek Myth: A Guide to Literary and Artistic Sources, Johns Hopkins University Press, 1996, Two volumes:  (Vol. 1),  (Vol. 2).
 Hanfmann, George, M. A., “Studies in Etruscan Bronze Reliefs: The Gigantomachy”, The Art Bulletin 19:463-85. 1937.
 Hesiod, Theogony, in The Homeric Hymns and Homerica with an English Translation by Hugh G. Evelyn-White, Cambridge, MA.,Harvard University Press; London, William Heinemann Ltd. 1914. Online version at the Perseus Digital Library.
 Hyginus, Gaius Julius, The Myths of Hyginus. Edited and translated by Mary A. Grant, Lawrence: University of Kansas Press, 1960.
 Moore, Mary B., "Giants at the Getty" in Greek Vases in the J. Paul Getty Museum Volume 2, Getty Publications, 1985
 Pausanias, Pausanias Description of Greece with an English Translation by W.H.S. Jones, Litt.D., and H.A. Ormerod, M.A., in 4 Volumes. Cambridge, MA, Harvard University Press; London, William Heinemann Ltd. 1918. Online version at the Perseus Digital Library.
 Strabo, Geography, translated by Horace Leonard Jones; Cambridge, Massachusetts: Harvard University Press; London: William Heinemann, Ltd. (1924). LacusCurtis, Books 6–14, at the Perseus Digital Library
 Vian, Francis, Moore, Mary B. (1988), "Gigantes" in Lexicon Iconographicum Mythologiae Classicae (LIMC) IV.1. Artemis Verlag, Zürich and Munich. .

Gigantes
Children of Gaia
Deeds of Poseidon